The year 540 BC was a year of the pre-Julian Roman calendar. In the Roman Empire, it was known as year 214  Ab urbe condita. The denomination 540 BC for this year has been used since the early medieval period, when the Anno Domini calendar era became the prevalent method in Europe for naming years.

Events

Cyrus attacks Babylonia
Greek city of Elea of southern Italy is founded (approximate date)
Persians conquer Lycian city of Xanthos (approximate date)
Amasis Painter makes Dionysos with maenads, black-figure decoration on an amphora
Exekias makes The Suicide of Ajax, black-figure decoration on an amphora
Amyntas I becomes king of Macedonia (approximate date)
Comet Hale–Bopp appears in the evening sky, making its closest approach to Earth. Its next appearance occurs in 1997

Births
 Epicharmus of Kos, Greek dramatist (approximate date; d. c. 450 BC)
 Leonidas I, leader of the 300 Spartans at the Battle of Thermopylae (approximate date; d. 480 BC)
 Vardhamana Mahavira, the twenty-fourth and last Tirthankara of the Jains 450 BC

Deaths

References